Aemene monastyrskii is a moth of the family Erebidae. It is found in Vietnam.

References

Moths described in 2013
Cisthenina
Moths of Asia